Mamidi Harikrishna is an Indian Telugu poet, illustrator, translator, documentary filmmaker, movie critic and Historian on Telangana state history and Films. He is currently the director of Language and Culture department of the Telangana government.

Birth, early life
Harikrishna was born in Shayampet of Warangal district. He did his schooling up to class X in his village. His intermediate education and degree were completed from Lalbahadur College in Warangal and his post-graduation MA in psychology from Osmania University. He further completed his MEd from Kakatiya University. Have done Ph.D. research on 'Folklore elements in Telugu Cinema a study', and received doctorate from Telugu University on 16th July 2022.

Poetry
Harikrishna has published three of his own poetry compilations and as a director of the Culture Department, published 50 above books of various writers and poets. He is credited with introducing "Fusion Shayaree" into Telugu poetry in 2014.

as writer 
 Telugu Cinemallao Basha-Saahithyam-Samskruthi (Essays on Film Criticism and Analysis)
 Ooriki Poyina Yalla (An anthology of selected 30 poems written in Telangana language between 1995-2018)
 Sushupthi Nunchi (An anthology of poems written between 1986-89)
 Ontareekarana (An anthology of selected 45 poems written between 1993-2003)
 Folklore elements in Telugu Cinema a study (Research Book)

as editor 
 Aashadeepam (Poetry on AIDS)
 Chigurantha Aasha (First ever largest collection of stories on AIDS awareness)
 Viniyogam - Vikasam Kosam (First ever collection of stories, poetry, cartoons on consumer rights awareness)

as editor (published by Dept. of Language and Culture, Government of Telangana) 
The Department of Language and Culture have published the following books.

 Tolipoddu
 Kotta Salu
 Tangedu Vanam
 Matti Mudra
 Padya Telanganam
 Talli Veru
 Akupachani Poddu Podupu
 Smara Narayaneeyam
 Golla Ramavva and other plays
 Kala Telanganam
 Patam Kathalu
 Telangana Harvest
 Naya Saal
 Telangana Tejomurthulu
 Telangana Vaggeyakara Vaibhavam
 Telugu Cartoon
 A Green Garland
 Kakateeya Prasthanam
 Swedha Bhoomi
 Women in Art & Culture
 Manaku Teliyani Telangana
 Tharikullo Telangana
 Telangana Ruchulu
 Jaya Jayosthu Telangana
 Where the head is held high
 Adirang Mahotsav -2017
 Culture of Amity: Glimpses of Dargahs of Hyderabad
 Mimescape of Telangana
 A Montage On Mime
 Eyewitness Of An Epoch
 Culture of Telangana At Surajkund
 Alugu Dunkina Aksharam
 Telangana Bonalu
 Samkshema Swaralu
 Echoes of Lines
 Udyama Geetha

Public Service
Harikrishna joined the state civil services (of erstwhile Andhra Pradesh) in 1996. He was appointed to his current position, Director of Language and Culture, on 28 October 2014.

Recognition
Harikrishna was awarded Best Film Critic in Telugu Cinema for the year 2009 and 2012. He is credited with organising the fifth edition of World Telugu Conference in Hyderabad in 2017. He was selected as the national poet from Telugu by Ministry of Information and Broadcasts, Government of India in 2019.

References

External links
 Mamidi Harikrishna's interview on Doordarshan Yadagiri
 Mamidi Harikrishna's youtube channel

Telugu people
Year of birth missing (living people)
Living people
Telugu poets
People from Hanamkonda district
Indian film critics
Nandi Award winners
Osmania University alumni
Writers from Telangana
Painters from Telangana
Indian illustrators
Indian male painters
Indian male writers
Indian traditions